"Anything" is a song recorded by American R&B vocal trio SWV for their debut studio album, It's About Time (1992) and the soundtrack to the 1994 film Above the Rim. It was written and produced by Brian Alexander Morgan.

Originally featured on It's About Time, the song was later remixed to be featured on the Above the Rim soundtrack. This resulted in the song's shifting from a slow, R&B ballad to a faster, new jack swing record (which is labelled the "Old Skool Mix") and features U-God, Ol' Dirty Bastard, and Method Man from the Wu-Tang Clan). Method Man’s final verse incorporates a brief sample of Wu-Tang Clan’s 1994 single “C.R.E.A.M.”. Released as a single in 1994, the song became a top-20 hit on the Billboard Hot 100, peaking at number 18 whilst also peaking at number four on the Billboard Hot R&B/Hip-Hop Songs chart, becoming the group's fifth top forty hit on the pop charts and its sixth top ten hit on the R&B charts. The single also found success in the Billboard Adult R&B Songs chart, peaking at number five, the group's highest peak along with Right Here/Human Nature, and the UK Singles Chart, peaking at number 30, becoming the group's fifth top 40 hit.

Critical reception 
James Hamilton from Music Weeks RM Dance Update described the song as a "EnVogue-ishly wailed jolting funky roller".

 Track listing and formats 
 US 7" single "Anything" - 4:20
 "You're Always on My Mind" - 4:36

 US 12" single "Anything" (12" Old Skool Version) - 5:00
 "Anything" (Old Skool Party Mix) - 5:15
 "Anything" (Bonus) - 3:37
 "Anything" (LP Remix Version) [Featuring Joe]  - 5:02

 UK CD maxi single "Anything" (Old Skool Mix) [Featuring Wu-Tang Clan] - 4:57
 "Anything" (Album Remix) - 5:04
 "Anything" (Old Skool Party Mix) - 5:17
 "Anything" (Album Instrumental) - 5:34

 US cassette single'
 "Anything" (Old Skool Radio) - 4:20
 "Anything" (LP Remix) - 5:02

Charts

Weekly charts

Year-end charts

References 

1994 singles
1994 songs
RCA Records singles
SWV songs